Konarsko is a village in Yakoruda Municipality, in Blagoevgrad Province, in southwestern Bulgaria. It is a mainly Pomak village.

References

Villages in Blagoevgrad Province